The Solemnity of Our Lord Jesus Christ, King of the Universe, commonly referred to as the Feast of Christ the King, Christ the King Sunday or Reign of Christ Sunday, is a feast in the liturgical year which emphasises the true kingship of Christ. The feast is a relatively recent addition to the liturgical calendar, instituted in 1925 by Pope Pius XI for the Roman Rite of the Catholic Church. 

In 1970 its Roman Rite observance was moved from October to the last Sunday of Ordinary Time and thus to the end of the liturgical year. The earliest date on which the Feast of Christ the King can occur is 20 November and the latest is 26 November. 

The Lutheran, Anglican, Moravian, Methodist, Nazarene, Reformed and United Protestant churches also celebrate the Feast of Christ the King, which is contained in the Revised Common Lectionary; the Methodist, Anglican and Presbyterian Churches often observe this as part of the liturgical season of Kingdomtide, which runs between the Fourth Sunday before Advent and the Feast of Christ the King. It is also observed on the same computed date as the final Sunday of the ecclesiastical year, the Sunday before the First Sunday of Advent, by Western Rite parishes of the Russian Orthodox Church Outside Russia. Roman Catholics adhering to the Extraordinary Form of the Roman Rite use the General Roman Calendar of 1960 and continue to observe the Solemnity on the date established in 1925, the final Sunday of October.

Origin in patristics

According to Cyril of Alexandria, Christ "has dominion over all creatures, a dominion not seized by violence nor usurped, but his by essence and by nature. His kingship is founded upon the hypostatic union. From this it follows not only that Christ is to be adored by angels and men, but that to him as man angels and men are subject, and must recognize his empire; by reason of the hypostatic union Christ has power over all creatures."

The Feast of Christ the King has an eschatological dimension pointing to the end of time when the kingdom of Jesus will be established in all its fullness to the ends of the earth. It leads into Advent, when the Church anticipates Christ’s second coming.

Observance

Roman Catholic Church 
Pope Pius XI instituted the Feast of Christ the King in his encyclical Quas primas of 1925, in response to growing secularism and secular ultra-nationalism, and in the context of the unresolved Roman Question.

In November 1926, Pope Pius XI gave his direct assent for the priest of a promising young parish in Mount Lookout, Cincinnati to establish the first church dedicated to Christ under the title of King. In May 1927, a purpose-built sanctuary was consecrated. 1956 saw the construction of the current church, led by the architect Edward J. Schulte. The campus is an unapologetic love letter to its royal namesake, featuring a towering Byzantine mosaic of Christ, crowned and robed, above the high altar where Catholic practice usually expects a crucifix (most protestant institutions simply employ symbolic crosses). This instance illustrates a marked change of tone that arose as a product of the Vatican's endorsement of this feast and the associated devotional.

The title of the feast was Domini Nostri Jesu Christi Regis ([of] Our Lord Jesus Christ the King), and the date was established as "the last Sunday of the month of October – the Sunday, that is, which immediately precedes the Feast of All Saints". 

In his motu proprio Mysterii Paschalis of 1969, Pope Paul VI amended the title of the Feast to Domini Nostri Iesu Christi universorum Regis (Our Lord Jesus Christ King of the Universe). He also moved it to the new date of the final Sunday of the liturgical year. Through this choice of date "the eschatological importance of this Sunday is made clearer". The feast was assigned the highest rank of solemnity.  The liturgical vestments for the day is white.

In the extraordinary form, as happens with all Sundays whose liturgies are replaced by those of important feasts, the prayers of the Sunday on which the celebration of the feast of Christ the King occurs are used on the ferias (weekdays) of the following week. The Sunday liturgy is thus not totally omitted.

Moravian Church 
In the Moravian Church, Reign of Christ Sunday is the feast marking the end of Pentecostide. White is the liturgical colour associated with the Reign of Christ.

Lutheran Churches 

In the Evangelical-Lutheran Church of Sweden and the Church of Finland, this day is referred to as Judgement Sunday, previously highlighting the final judgement, though after the Swedish Lectionary of 1983 the theme of the day was amended to the Return of Christ. A distinct season of Kingdomtide is or has been observed by a number of churches on the four Sundays before Advent, either officially or semi-officially.

Anglican Churches 
In the Church of England, the Feast of Christ the King falls on "the Sunday next before Advent," when "[t]he year that begins with the hope of the coming Messiah ends with the proclamation of his universal sovereignty."

In the Episcopal Church (United States), Christ the King Sunday "is unofficially celebrated in some Episcopal parishes, but it is not mentioned in the Episcopal calendar of the church year."

Reformed Churches 
The Continental Reformed Churches, such as the Christian Reformed Churches, assign the following hymns to be used on the Feast of Christ the King: "Crown Him with Many Crowns", "Lo! He comes with clouds descending", and "Rejoice, the Lord Is King".

In the Presbyterian Churches, such as the Presbyterian Church (USA), at the Feast of Christ the King (Feast of the Reign of Christ) "the church gives thanks and praise for sovereignty of Christ, who is Lord of all creation and is coming again in glory to reign (see Revelation 1:4-8)."

In the United Church of Christ, a Congregationalist denomination, the Feast of Christ the King is the last Sunday of the liturgical season known as the Time of the Church.

Methodist Churches 
The Feast of Christ the King is observed in the Methodist Churches, such as the United Methodist Church, as the last Sunday of the liturgical season of Kingdomtide. The season of Kingdtomtide itself starts on Trinity Sunday and culminates in the Feast of Christ the King. Some Methodist parishes have been dedicated to Christ the King.

United Protestant Churches
In United Protestant Churches, such as the United Church of Canada, Uniting Church of Australia, Church of North India, Church of Pakistan and Church of South India, the Feast of Christ the King (Reign of Christ), is observed as the last Lord's Day of the liturgical calendar.

See also 
 Stir-up Sunday

Explanatory notes

References

External links
 Pope Benedict XVI, "Pope Benedict: Angelus for the feast of Christ the King", News.VA 

Catholic holy days
Christ the King
Christian Sunday observances
Church of Sweden
Festivals established in 1925
Holidays and observances by scheduling (nth weekday of the month)
November observances
October observances
Pope Pius XI
Recurring events established in 1925